This is a list of candidates for the 1874–75 New South Wales colonial election. The election was held from 8 December 1874 to 12 January 1875.

There was no recognisable party structure at this election.

Retiring Members
Goldfields North MLA James Rodd had resigned on 16 November 1874 and writs issued for a by-election, which was cancelled when the general election was called.

James Campbell MLA (Morpeth)
Edward Combes MLA (Bathurst)
John Creed MLA (Upper Hunter)
Leopold De Salis MLA (Queanbeyan)
William Grahame MLA (Monaro)
Lewis Levy MLA (West Maitland)
William Macleay MLA (Murrumbidgee)
John Nowlan MLA (Williams)
George Oakes MLA (East Sydney)
Joseph Single MLA (Nepean)
William Tunks MLA (St Leonards)
Thomas West MLA (Carcoar)

Legislative Assembly
Sitting members are shown in bold text. Successful candidates are highlighted.

Electorates are arranged chronologically from the day the poll was held. Because of the sequence of polling, some sitting members who were defeated in their constituencies were then able to contest other constituencies later in the polling period. On the second occasion, these members are shown in italic text.

See also
 Members of the New South Wales Legislative Assembly, 1874–1877

References
 

1874-75